Take a Back Road is the fourth studio album by American country music artist Rodney Atkins. It was released on October 4, 2011 by Curb Records. The album's first single, its title track", is the fastest-rising and sixth number one hit of Atkins' career. The second single, "He's Mine," was previously recorded by Billy Ray Cyrus on his 2009 album Back to Tennessee. "Just Wanna Rock N' Roll" was released as the album's third single in June 2012.

Track listing

Personnel
 Rodney Atkins - lead vocals
 Liam Bailey - banjo
 Ashley Cleveland - background vocals 
 Mike Doucette - harmonica
 Larry Franklin - fiddle, mandolin
 Vicki Hampton - background vocals
 Ted Hewitt - acoustic guitar, electric guitar, percussion, background vocals
 Angela Hurt - background vocals
 Mike Johnson - steel guitar
 Kim Keyes - background vocals
 Troy Lancaster - electric guitar
 Tim Lauer - keyboards
 Brent Mason - electric guitar
 Gordon Mote - keyboards
 Larry Paxton - bass guitar
 Jack Pearson - slide guitar
 Mark Prentice - bass guitar
 Gary Prim - keyboards
 Scotty Sanders - steel guitar
 Bryan Sutton - banjo, acoustic guitar, mandolin
 Ilya Toshinsky - banjo, acoustic guitar, mandolin
 Lonnie Wilson - drums, percussion

Charts

Weekly charts

Year-end charts

Singles

ADid not enter the Hot 100, but peaked on Bubbling Under Hot 100 Singles.

References

Rodney Atkins albums
2011 albums
Curb Records albums